The Coach and Horses is a Grade II listed public house at London Road, Isleworth, London.

It was built in the 18th century, with later alterations. Charles Dickens mentions the pub in his novel Oliver Twist.

References

Grade II listed buildings in the London Borough of Hounslow
Grade II listed pubs in London
Pubs in the London Borough of Hounslow
Isleworth